Antoine Brooks Jr. (born October 28, 1997) is an American football safety for the Seattle Sea Dragons of the XFL. He played college football at Maryland and was drafted by the Pittsburgh Steelers in the sixth round of the 2020 NFL Draft.

Early life and high school
Brooks grew up in Lanham, Maryland and attended DuVal High School. He was a starting defensive back and quarterback for the Tigers. As a junior, he was named first-team All-Metro by The Washington Post and
first-team All-State at defensive back. Midway through his senior season Brooks suffered a compound fracture on his ankle and a broken wrist while throwing a pass against Wise High School, requiring five hours of surgery to repair and putting his football career in doubt. He was still named second-team All-Metro, first-team All-State and the Prince George's County 4A Offensive Player of the Year despite missing half of the season. Although he originally had over 15 scholarship offers, much of his recruiting interest faded after his injury and he initially committed to play college football at Buffalo. Brooks committed to play at Maryland a few days before National Signing Day after a late push from coach D. J. Durkin over offers from Pitt, Indiana, Hawaii, Buffalo, Army, Old Dominion and Charlotte.

College career
Brooks played in six games, mostly on special teams, during his freshman season before being suspended for the rest of the season. He became the Terrapins' primary nickel back as a sophomore and finished second on the team with 77 tackles and led all defensive backs in the Big Ten Conference with 9.5 tackles for loss along with one sack, two interceptions, three pass breakups and a forced fumble. As a junior, Brooks was Maryland's third leading tackler with 68 and led the team with 9.5 tackles for loss with 2.5 sacks, three passes defended and an interception and was named second-team All-Big Ten by the league's coaches. As a senior, Brooks played safety and nickel linebacker and lead the team with 87 tackles with 8.5 tackles for loss, and interception and six passes defended and again named second-team All-Big Ten by the coaches and to the third-team by the media.

Professional career

Pittsburgh Steelers
Brooks was selected by the Pittsburgh Steelers with the 198th pick in the sixth round of the 2020 NFL Draft. He was waived on September 5, 2020, and signed to the practice squad the next day. He was elevated to the active roster on October 31, November 7, November 14, and November 30 for the team's weeks 8, 9, 10, and 12 games against the Baltimore Ravens, Dallas Cowboys, Cincinnati Bengals, and Ravens, and reverted to the practice squad after each game. He was signed to the active roster on December 3.

On August 24, 2021, Brooks was waived/injured and placed on injured reserve. He was released on September 2, 2021.

Los Angeles Rams
On September 4, 2021, Brooks was signed to the Los Angeles Rams practice squad. He was promoted to the active roster on November 9, 2021. He was waived on January 29, 2022 and re-signed to the practice squad. Brooks won Super Bowl LVI when the Rams defeated the Cincinnati Bengals.

On February 15, 2022, Brooks signed a reserve/future contract with the Rams. He was waived on May 4, 2022.

Seattle Sea Dragons 
On November 17, 2022, Brooks was drafted by the Seattle Sea Dragons of the XFL.

References

External links
Maryland Terrapins bio

1997 births
Living people
African-American players of American football
Players of American football from Maryland
Sportspeople from the Washington metropolitan area
American football safeties
People from Lanham, Maryland
Maryland Terrapins football players
Pittsburgh Steelers players
Los Angeles Rams players
Seattle Sea Dragons players
21st-century African-American sportspeople